Peter Mungai Warui (born 22 April 1981) is a Kenyan boxer. He competed in the men's light flyweight event at the 2016 Summer Olympics where he was eliminated in the quarter-finals.

Career
Warui began boxing at the age of nine. As he could not afford gloves, he initially boxed bare-knuckled. 

As an adult, Warui boxed for the Kenyan Police team while working as a police constable.

Olympics
Warui  finished in fourth place in the African qualifiers for the 2016 Summer Olympics. He qualified for the tournament finals after a Cameroonian boxer was disqualified.

In the round of 16, Warui defeated Lü Bin on a split decision. He attracted media attention for his flamboyant celebration after the win. In the quarter-finals, Warui was defeated by Cuban boxer Joahnys Argilagos.

References

External links
 

1981 births
Living people
Kenyan male boxers
Olympic boxers of Kenya
Boxers at the 2016 Summer Olympics
Place of birth missing (living people)
Light-flyweight boxers